The 2022 season was the 108th in Sociedade Esportiva Palmeiras' existence. This season Palmeiras participated in the Campeonato Paulista, Copa Libertadores, Copa do Brasil, Série A and Recopa Sudamericana.

Squad information

Transfers

Transfers in

Transfers out

Competitions

Overview

Campeonato Paulista 

Palmeiras was drawn into Group C.

First stage

Quarter-final

Semi-final

Finals

Copa Libertadores

Group stage 

The draw for the group stage was held on 25 March 2022, 12:00 PYST (UTC−3), at the CONMEBOL Convention Centre in Luque, Paraguay.

Round of 16 

The draw for the round of 16 was held on 27 May 2022, 12:00 PYST (UTC−4), at the CONMEBOL Convention Centre in Luque, Paraguay.

Quarter-finals

Semi-finals

Série A

Standings

Result by round

Matches

Copa do Brasil

Third round 
The draw for the third round was held on 28 March 2022. The order of the matches were announced later on the same day.

Round of 16 
The draw for the round of 16 was held on 7 June 2022 at CBF headquarters in Rio de Janeiro. The order of the matches were announced later on the same day.

Recopa Sudamericana 

Palmeiras qualified for the 2022 Recopa Sudamericana by winning the 2021 Copa Libertadores.

Statistics

Overall statistics

Goalscorers 
In italic players who left the team in mid-season.

External links 
 Official site

References 

2022
Palmeiras